These 193 species belong to Copturus, a genus of true weevils in the family Curculionidae.

Copturus species

 Copturus abnormis Heller, 1895
 Copturus adspersus J. Lec., 1876
 Copturus affaber Boheman, 1838
 Copturus aguacatae Kissinger, 1957
 Copturus albidus Champion, 1906
 Copturus albiventris Hustache, 1937
 Copturus albopictus Kirsch, 1875
 Copturus albosuturalis Hustache, 1937
 Copturus albotorquatus Heller, 1895
 Copturus amazonicus Heller, 1895
 Copturus amictus Hustache, 1937
 Copturus amoenus Champion, 1906
 Copturus angustus Hustache, 1937
 Copturus apicalis Kirsch, 1875
 Copturus argenteiventris Hustache, 1937
 Copturus armatus Gyllenhal, 1838
 Copturus atrosignatus Champion, 1906
 Copturus auritus Schoenherr, 1845
 Copturus avicularis Boheman, 1838
 Copturus batesi Hustache, 1932
 Copturus bellus Kirsch, 1875
 Copturus besckei Boheman, 1838
 Copturus bicinctus Champion, 1906
 Copturus binotatus J. Lec., 1876
 Copturus bisellatus Pascoe, 1880
 Copturus brevicollis Hustache, 1937
 Copturus brevis Waterh., 1875-82 (7
 Copturus carinatus Boheman, 1838
 Copturus cavisternus Hustache, 1937
 Copturus centralis Champion, 1906
 Copturus centropictus Fall, 1906
 Copturus chlorus Heller, 1895
 Copturus cincticollis Champion, 1906
 Copturus cinereolineatus Hustache, 1937
 Copturus cinnabarinus Hustache, 1937
 Copturus concinnus Boheman, 1845
 Copturus condecoratus Boheman, 1845
 Copturus confinis Boheman, 1845
 Copturus congoanus Hustache, 1928
 Copturus conjunctus Pascoe, 1880
 Copturus constrictus Champion, 1906
 Copturus conturbatus Heller, 1895
 Copturus convexicollis Kirsch, 1875
 Copturus corumbaensis Hustache, 1937
 Copturus coryphaeus Erichson, 1847
 Copturus costatus Boheman, 1838
 Copturus crassus Champion, 1925
 Copturus crenatus Heller, 1895
 Copturus cribricollis Champion, 1906
 Copturus cristulatus Hustache, 1937
 Copturus crux Pascoe, 1880
 Copturus cyphogaster Kirsch, 1875
 Copturus decussatus Heller, 1895
 Copturus dehiscens Fall, 1906
 Copturus deplanus Schoenherr, 1838
 Copturus dorsalis Kirsch, 1875
 Copturus dufani Hust., 1932
 Copturus dufaui Hustache, 1932
 Copturus episternalis Heller, 1895
 Copturus equatoriensis Hustache, 1937
 Copturus exaratus Champion, 1906
 Copturus femoralis Kirsch, 1875
 Copturus figuratus Boheman, 1845
 Copturus filicornis Fall, 1906
 Copturus floridanus (Fall, 1906)
 Copturus fulvocruciatus Champion, 1906
 Copturus fulvodorsalis Hustache, 1937
 Copturus fulvomaculatus Champion, 1906
 Copturus fulvosignatus Champion, 1906
 Copturus fulvus Hustache, 1937
 Copturus funebris Hustache, 1937
 Copturus furfuraceus Schoenherr, 1845
 Copturus gracilipes Champion, 1906
 Copturus gracilis Heller, 1895
 Copturus griseotessellatus Hustache, 1937
 Copturus guttula-alba Boh. in Schoenh., 1828
 Copturus guttulaalba Boheman, 1838
 Copturus histricus Champion, 1906
 Copturus horridus Fall, 1906
 Copturus ignicollis Champion, 1906
 Copturus infimus Boheman, 1838
 Copturus inornatus Kirsch, 1875
 Copturus jatrophae Fall, 1906
 Copturus laetus Heller, 1895
 Copturus lamella Dejean, 1835
 Copturus lamprothorax Heller, 1895
 Copturus lanio Erichson, 1847
 Copturus laterensis Boheman, 1845
 Copturus latifemoris Heller, 1895
 Copturus latior Heller, 1895
 Copturus latitarsis Champion, 1906
 Copturus lebasi Boh. in Schoenh., 1838
 Copturus lebasii Boheman, 1838
 Copturus leucoventris Hustache, 1931
 Copturus limolatus Fairm., 1880
 Copturus lineolatus Chevrolat, 1880
 Copturus littoralis Fall, 1906
 Copturus longulus J. Lec., 1876
 Copturus lucidus Hust., 1932
 Copturus ludiosus Boheman, 1838
 Copturus lunatus Hustache, 1937
 Copturus luteus Hustache, 1937
 Copturus lynceus Champion, 1906
 Copturus lyra Pascoe, 1880
 Copturus maculatus Boheman, 1845
 Copturus maculosus Champion, 1906
 Copturus marmoreus Heller, 1895
 Copturus mediinotus Fall, 1906
 Copturus megerlei Boheman, 1845
 Copturus mexicanus Heller, 1895
 Copturus miles Heller, 1895
 Copturus mimeticus Hespenheide, 1984
 Copturus mimus Heller, 1895
 Copturus minutus Hustache, 1937
 Copturus monostigma Hustache, 1937
 Copturus montezuma Champion, 1906
 Copturus multiguttatus Champion, 1906
 Copturus musculus Pasc., 1880
 Copturus musica Kirsch, 1875
 Copturus mutabilis Hustache, 1932
 Copturus nanulus Lec., 1876
 Copturus nebulosus Kirsch, 1875
 Copturus neohispanicus Heller, 1895
 Copturus niger Kirsch, 1875
 Copturus nigritarsis Hustache, 1931
 Copturus nigromaculatus Hustache, 1932
 Copturus nobilis Heller, 18895
 Copturus obliquefasciatus Hustache, 1937
 Copturus ocularis Kirsch, 1875
 Copturus oculatus Schoenherr, 1838
 Copturus operculatus Schoenherr, 1838
 Copturus ornatus Hustache, 1937
 Copturus osphiliades Hustache, 1937
 Copturus papaveratum Schoenherr, 1825
 Copturus paroticus Pascoe, 1880
 Copturus paschalis Hespenheide, 1984
 Copturus pectoralis Kirsch, 1875
 Copturus perdix Kirsch, 1875
 Copturus perseae Günther, 1935
 Copturus perturbatus Gyllenhal, 1838
 Copturus peruvianus Hustache, 1937
 Copturus pipa Schoenherr, 1838
 Copturus posticus Kirsch, 1875
 Copturus princeps Fall, 1906
 Copturus pulcher C.O. Waterh., 1879
 Copturus quadricinctus Heller, 1895
 Copturus quadricolor Champion, 1906
 Copturus quadridens Horn, 1894
 Copturus quercus Schoenherr, 1838
 Copturus rectirostris Hustache, 1937
 Copturus regalis Boheman, 1845
 Copturus rhombifer Heller, 1895
 Copturus rorulentus Boheman, 1838
 Copturus roseisignatus Boheman, 1838
 Copturus roseosignatus Boh. in Schoenh., 1838
 Copturus rubricollis Gyllenhal, 1838
 Copturus ruficeps Kirsch, 1875
 Copturus ruficollis Champion, 1906
 Copturus rufinasus Boh., 1859
 Copturus rufirostris Kirsch, 1875
 Copturus rugosipes Hustache, 1937
 Copturus sannio Gyllenhal, 1838
 Copturus satyrus Gyllenhal, 1838
 Copturus scapha Kirsch, 1869
 Copturus scolopax Heller, 1895
 Copturus semicitrinus Hustache, 1937
 Copturus semirufus Hustache, 1931
 Copturus senilis Schoenherr, 1845
 Copturus sericeus Champion, 1906
 Copturus severini Heller, 1895
 Copturus signaticollis Kirsch, 1875
 Copturus sobrinus Horn, 1895
 Copturus solieri Boheman, 1845
 Copturus subfasciatus Kirsch, 1875
 Copturus subulipennis Gyllenhal, 1838
 Copturus subundatus Boheman, 1845
 Copturus sulcatus Heller, 1895
 Copturus sulcifrons Kirsch, 1875
 Copturus tibialis Hustache, 1937
 Copturus torquatus Heller, 1895
 Copturus tricolor Champion, 1906
 Copturus trimaculata Motsch., 1866
 Copturus troglodytes Boheman, 1838
 Copturus ulula Schoenherr, 1838
 Copturus undatus Champion, 1906
 Copturus unifasciatus Champion, 1906
 Copturus variegatus Kirsch, 1875
 Copturus verrucosus Champion, 1906
 Copturus vestitus Boheman, 1838
 Copturus vicinus Hustache, 1937
 Copturus vitticollis Kirsch, 1875
 Copturus zurumorpha Hustache, 1937
 Copturus zygopsicus Heller, 1895

References

Copturus